The West James Street Overpass is a historic bridge in Redfield, Arkansas. It carries West James Street (or Avenue) across the Union Pacific railroad tracks near the center of the community. Its abutments are a combination of wood and concrete, and the posts supporting the trestles are mounted on concrete footings. It was built in 1924. The bridge was listed on the National Register of Historic Places in 1995.

See also
List of bridges documented by the Historic American Engineering Record in Arkansas
List of bridges on the National Register of Historic Places in Arkansas
National Register of Historic Places listings in Jefferson County, Arkansas

References

External links

1924 establishments in Arkansas
Bridges completed in 1924
Historic American Engineering Record in Arkansas
Landmarks in Arkansas
National Register of Historic Places in Redfield, Arkansas
Road bridges on the National Register of Historic Places in Arkansas
Trestle bridges in the United States
Wooden bridges in the United States
Transportation in Jefferson County, Arkansas